Pizzo di Claro (also known as Visagno) is a 2,727 metres high mountain of the Lepontine Alps, located on the border between the Swiss cantons of Ticino and Graubünden. It overlooks Claro on its western side, although Cresciano is closer. On its eastern side it overlooks the valley of Calanca near Arvigo (Graubünden). A small lake lies west of the summit at 2,198 metres, Lago Canee.

Marked trails lead to the summit from both sides, the shortest route starting from above Arvigo.

References

External links
Pizzo di Claro on Summitpost
Pizzo di Claro on Hikr

Lepontine Alps
Mountains of the Alps
Mountains of Ticino
Mountains of Graubünden
Graubünden–Ticino border
Mountains of Switzerland
Two-thousanders of Switzerland
Calanca